Lorenzo Bertini (born 1 June 1976 in Pontedera) is an Italian rower. His sister Lisa Bertini is also an Olympic rower.

References

External links

 
 

1976 births
Living people
Italian male rowers
People from Pontedera
Olympic rowers of Italy
Rowers at the 2004 Summer Olympics
Olympic bronze medalists for Italy
Olympic medalists in rowing
World Rowing Championships medalists for Italy
Medalists at the 2004 Summer Olympics
Mediterranean Games bronze medalists for Italy
Mediterranean Games medalists in rowing
Competitors at the 2005 Mediterranean Games
Rowers of Fiamme Oro
Sportspeople from the Province of Pisa